Lashar County is in Sistan and Baluchestan province, Iran. The capital of the county is the city of Espakeh. At the 2006 census, the county's population (as two rural districts and a city of Lashar District of Nik Shahr County) was 26,576 in 5,663 households. The following census in 2011 counted 30,720 people, in 7,721 households. At the 2016 census, the population of those divisions was 33,973, in 9,123 households. They were separated from the county in 2021 to become Lashar County.

Administrative divisions

The population history of Lashar County's administrative divisions over three consecutive censuses is shown in the following table.

References

Counties of Sistan and Baluchestan Province

fa:شهرستان لاشار